The Acklam Wold transmitting station is located between Acklam and Leavening, on the Yorkshire Wolds at grid reference SE795619. It carries BBC Radio York 103.7 at 2.0 kW, and Greatest Hits Radio York and North Yorkshire 104.7 at 2.5 kW. It broadcasts down to Sheffield and up to the North York Moors just outside Whitby. It also carries the Muxco North Yorkshire and BBC National DAB multiplexes.

Services available from this transmitter

Analogue radio (VHF FM)

Digital radio (DAB)

References

Buildings and structures in North Yorkshire
Mass media in Yorkshire
Ryedale
Transmitter sites in England